Freddie Trenkler (January 9, 1913 - May 21, 2001) was a comic ice skater.

He was born in Austria. He dressed in rags and was known for his hilarious stumbles and falls on Broadway, television and film.

Trenkler died at age 88 in California.

Television
The Ed Sullivan Show (1957)

Films
The Countess of Monte Cristo (1948)

Broadway
Howdy Mr. Ice (1949)
Icetime (1946–1947)
It Happens on Ice (1941–1942)

References

External links
 Internet Movie Database

1913 births
2001 deaths
Austrian male stage actors
Austrian male television actors
Austrian male film actors
Skaters
20th-century Austrian male actors
Austrian emigrants to the United States